ICN Radio is an Italian-language radio in the New York metropolitan area, founded in 1983 by Sal Palmeri and  since 2006 owned by America Oggi, the only Italian daily newspaper in the United States. The programming consists of a mixed news/talk format along with music. ICN is also an affiliate of Italy's RAI radio network. It claims an audience of 250,000 households.

The station transmits on the 67 kHz subcarrier of WBGO FM in Newark, New Jersey, but can be heard on the internet at www.ICNRADIO.com.

See also
America Oggi

References

External links
ICN Radio Web Site
America Oggi Web Site
RAI International Web Site

Italian-language mass media in the United States
Italian-language radio stations
Italian-American culture in New Jersey
Italian-American culture in New York (state)
Radio stations broadcasting on subcarriers
Foreign-language radio stations in the United States